Life imprisonment has been the most severe criminal sentence in New Zealand since the death penalty was abolished in 1989, having not been used since 1957. 

Offenders sentenced to life imprisonment must serve a minimum of 10 years imprisonment before they are eligible for parole, although the sentencing judge may set a longer minimum period or decline to set a minimum period at all (meaning the offender will spend the rest of their life in prison). Released offenders remain on parole and are subject to electronic tagging for the rest of their life.

Life imprisonment in New Zealand for crimes other than murder is relatively rare. Of 941 life sentences imposed since 1980, only seven have been for crimes other than murder – one for manslaughter in 1996, one for an act of terrorism in 2020, and five for drug offences in 1985, 1996, 2008 (two) and 2009.

Offences
Life imprisonment is the mandatory sentence for treason. It is the presumptive sentence for murder, being mandatory unless in the circumstances it would be manifestly unjust. Life imprisonment is an optional sentence for aircraft hijacking, Class A drug dealing, manslaughter and terrorism.

Life imprisonment for murder
The imposition of life imprisonment for murder is codified in sections 102 to 104 of the Sentencing Act 2002.

Circumstances where life imprisonment might be deemed manifestly unjust include mercy killings, suicide pacts, and "battered defendants" who were subjected to "prolonged and severe abuse".

There is no minimum age for imposing life imprisonment. The youngest people sentenced to life imprisonment in New Zealand were aged 13 years at the time of the offence.

Case law
 R v Williams [2005] 2 NZLR 506 – judgement providing guidance on sentencing offenders subject to the 17-year minimum period of imprisonment contained in section 104 of the Sentencing Act 2002.
 Churchward v R [2011] NZCA 531; (2011) 25 CRNZ 446 – judgement providing guidance on imposing minimum periods of imprisonment when sentencing adolescent offenders.

Longest minimum periods of imprisonment
A sentence of life imprisonment without the possibility of parole has been given only once, to Brenton Tarrant for the Christchurch mosque shootings in March 2019. The longest minimum period of imprisonment on a sentence of life imprisonment with possibility of parole is 30 years, currently being served by William Dwane Bell.

Sentences imposed with a minimum term of imprisonment of 20 years or more or with no possibility of parole include:

Antonie Dixon was given a minimum term of 20 years for the murder of James Te Aute on 21 January 2003, but the conviction was later quashed. He was re-tried and reconvicted, but committed suicide in his prison cell before he could be re-sentenced.

The longest minimum period for a woman is 19 years, currently being served by Tracy Jean Goodman for the murder of pensioner Mona Morriss in the course of a burglary in Marton in January 2005.

Preventive detention

There is also provision for an indefinite sentence of preventive detention, which can be given for sexual or violent crimes for which life imprisonment is not available (preventive detention can be imposed alongside life imprisonment, for example, where convictions for sexual or violent crimes accompany a murder conviction). Since the Sentencing Act 2002 came into force, this has been given to repeat sexual offenders and serious violent recidivist offenders. Preventive detention has a minimum period of imprisonment of five years, but the sentencing judge can extend this if they believe that the prisoner's history warrants it. The sentence of preventive detention was first introduced in the Criminal Justice Act 1954.

The longest minimum period of imprisonment on a sentence of preventive detention is one of 28 years, which was given in 1984.

References

New Zealand
Law enforcement in New Zealand
Sentencing (law)